In May 1983, two Israeli Air Force aircraft, an F-15 Eagle and an A-4 Skyhawk, collided in mid-air during a training exercise over the Negev region, in Israel. Notably, the F-15, (with a crew of two), managed to land safely at a nearby airbase, despite having its right wing almost completely sheared off in the collision. The lifting body properties of the F-15, together with its overabundant engine thrust, allowed the pilot to achieve this unique feat.

Accident 
On 1 May 1983, during an Israeli Air Force dissimilar air combat training session over the Negev, an F-15D Eagle (or Baz) collided with an A-4 Skyhawk. The pilot of the Skyhawk was automatically ejected and his aircraft disintegrated. The crew of the two-seat training version F-15, pilot Zivi Nedivi and navigator Yehoar Gal, did not initially realize the extent of the damage, as fuel leaking profusely and vaporizing at the wing attachment was obscuring their view of the area where the wing once was.

The F-15 started rolling uncontrollably after the collision and the instructor ordered an ejection. Nedivi, who outranked the instructor, decided not to eject and attempted recovery by engaging the afterburner, and eventually regained control of the aircraft. He was able to maintain control because of the lift generated by the large areas of the fuselage, stabilators, and remaining wing. Diverting to Ramon Airbase, the F-15 landed at twice the normal speed to maintain the necessary lift, and its tailhook was torn off completely during the landing. He later told The History Channel, "it's highly likely that if I had seen it clearly I would have ejected, because it was obvious you couldn't really fly an airplane like that." He added, "Only when [McDonnell Douglas] later went to analyze it, they said, OK, the F-15 has a very wide [lifting] body; you fly fast enough and you're like a rocket. You don't need wings."

Aftermath 
The aircraft, 106 Squadron's 957 Markia Schakim (Sky Blazer), was transported by road to an IAF maintenance unit at Tel Nof, where it was repaired. Having already claimed four enemy aircraft during the 1982 Lebanon War, the repaired aircraft was to claim a shared kill of another Syrian MiG-23 on November 19, 1985.

References 

Israeli Air Force
Aviation accidents and incidents in Israel
Aviation accidents and incidents in 1983
Mid-air collisions
Mid-air collisions involving military aircraft
May 1983 events in Asia
1983 in Israel